Alessandro "Alex" Momesso is a former Italian-Canadian soccer player. He was a standout player that most notably played for the Montréal Italia / Cantalia FC franchise in the 1950s.

From 1951 to 1958, Momesso played for Italia / Cantalia, who played in Montréal League and the National Soccer League of Ontario/Québec. In 1951, he helped Italia reach the semi-final stage of Canadian final. In 1954, Momesso won the McLagan Trophy as Montreal's most valuable player.

Personal life
Alessandro's son is former NHL player Sergio Momesso.

References

External links

Year of birth missing (living people)
Living people
Italian footballers
Association football fullbacks
Montreal Ukrainians players